Mandragora is a 1997 film by Polish director Wiktor Grodecki about the mental and physical decline of a 15-year-old boy who runs away from his seemingly distanced father to Prague, where he becomes a victim of the drug and sex scene.

The film is the last of Grodecki's trilogy of films about male prostitution, the other two being Not Angels But Angels and Body Without Soul.

Cast
 Miroslav Čáslavka as Marek
 David Švec as David
 Pavel Skřípal as Honza
 Kostas Zerdolaglu as Krysa
 Miroslav Breu as Libor
 Jiří Kodeš as Father
 Karel Polišenský as Sascha
 Richard Toth as George
 Jiří Pachman as Pan Franta
 Pavel Kočí as Rudy
 Jitka Smutná as Krysa's Wife

Other cast members; Jiří Kaftan, Břetislav Farský, Michell Turchetti and Tomáš Petrák

References

External links 
 

1997 films
Czech LGBT-related films
1990s Czech-language films
1997 drama films
Czech thriller films
LGBT-related drama films
1997 LGBT-related films